The 2006 European Under-21 Baseball Championship was an international baseball competition held in the Friuli region of Italy from July 9 to 16, 2006. It featured teams from Austria, Bulgaria, Hungary, Israel, Italy, Malta, Russia, Serbia and Montenegro, Slovakia and Ukraine.

In the end the team from Russia won the tournament.

Group stage

Pool A

Standings

Pool B

Standings

Game results

Final round

9th place

7th place

5th place

Semi-finals

3rd place

Final

Final standings

External links
Game Results

References

European Under-21 Baseball Championship
European Under-21 Baseball Championship
2006
2006 in Italian sport